Those are the Guinea national football team all time results:

Results

GANEFO: Games of the New Emerging Forces
A.C.C. Amilcar Cabral Cup

1960–1979

1980–2000

 FIFA.com – Guinea: Fixtures and Results
 Mali and Guinea at Friendlies soccer league – Wednesday 11 August 2010
 Guinea – Guinea – Results, fixtures, squad, statistics, photos, videos and news – Soccerway
 World Cup FIFA 1930 – 2014 (all final and preliminary competition)
 goalzz.com: Live sports scores, news and more
 SoccerPunter.com – Guinea Past Results and Match Fixtures
 
 Guinea. National football team
  1987–2004 matches

2001– 
? matches played:

 International matches – Historical Overview

2002–2004

 2012 Africa Cup of Nations qualification#Group B 1-4
 2012 Africa Cup of Nations qualification#Group B 1-0

 The RSSSF Archive – International Country Results – Friendly Tournaments 2003–2010
 Weltfussballarchiv | Guinea | National Soccer Team

References 

Guinea – List of International Matches

Notes 

1962-2019